Bully tree is a common name for several neotropical trees in the family Sapotaceae and may refer to:

Sideroxylon spp. a few, a genus of flowering plants
Manilkara spp. Manilkara bidentata, Manilkara spectabilis, Manilkara zapota  etc., trees
Pouteria multiflora, a tree (also called the broad-leaved lucuma)
Terminalia amazonia, a tree from North South America to Middle America
 as bastard bully tree: Pithecellobium lanceolotum, Sideroxylon americanum (Syn.: Bumelia retusa), Sideroxylon salicifolium Mountain, White Bully tree, Sideroxylon portoricense  subsp. portoricense (Syn.: Bumelia nigra, Dipholis nigra) Black, Red Bully tree